Agrilozodes is a genus of beetles in the family Buprestidae, tribe Stigmoderini, containing the following species:

Species
The genus includes the following species:

 Agrilozodes ocularis (Kerremans, 1903)
 Agrilozodes praeclarus (Perroud, 1853)
 Agrilozodes pygmaeus (Kerremans, 1897)
 Agrilozodes suarezi (Cobos, 1962)
 Agrilozodes valverdei (Cobos, 1962)

References

External links
 
 

Buprestidae genera